Armando Colafrancesco (born 4 October 1951) is an Italian former footballer who, playing as a midfielder, made 33 appearances in the Italian professional leagues. The three games he played in his debut 1969–70 season for A.S. Roma remained his only appearances in Serie A.

See also
Football in Italy
List of football clubs in Italy

References

1951 births
Living people
Italian footballers
Association football midfielders
A.S. Roma players
U.S. Avellino 1912 players
U.S. Viterbese 1908 players
A.C.N. Siena 1904 players
Serie A players